Butrón is a Spanish surname. Notable people with this surname include:

Jahir Butrón Gotuzzo (born 1975), Peruvian footballer 
Leao Butrón Gotuzzo (born 1977), Peruvian footballer 
Francisco Antonio de Lorenzana y Butrón (1722 – 1804), Catholic Cardinal, also served as Archbishop of Mexico
Gabriel Gregorio Fernando José María García Moreno y Morán de Butrón (1821 – 1875), Ecuadorian politician, twice President of Ecuador
Gaby López (Maria Gabriela López Butron, born 1993), Mexican professional golfer
Gerardo Esquivel Butrón, Mexican retired football midfielder
, Agrentinian musician, singer, and music producer

See also
, noble feudal family of the Crown of Castile

Spanish-language surnames